Sunday Morning Fever is the third album from the British rock band The Candyskins.  It is the band's first release after being dropped by Geffen Records and signing with the indie label, Ultimate, and is their last album with original bassist Karl Shale.  The album boasts three singles that all cracked the UK Singles Chart: "Mrs. Hoover", "Hang Myself on You", and the band's only Top 40 hit "Monday Morning".

Track list

Personnel
Nick Cope – vocals
Mark Cope – guitar
Nick Burton – lead guitar
Karl Shale – bass
John Halliday - drums
Rob Lord - keyboards

Reception

Stephen Thomas Erlewine of Allmusic writes "the record is filled with alternately crunching and ringing guitar hooks and pretty melodies" and "has a raw, infectious energy" but "is hampered by undistinguished and uneven songwriting, as well as predictable melodies".

Charts
UK Singles Chart

References

The Candyskins albums
1997 albums